Barney William Irwin (born September 17, 1954) is an American retired professional wrestler, better known by his ring name, "Wild" Bill Irwin. Irwin is also known for his appearances with the World Wrestling Federation as The Goon in 1996 to 1997. He is the brother of the late Scott Irwin.

Professional wrestling career

Mid South beginning of The Super Destroyers/The Long Riders (1977–1987)
Trained by his brother Scott Irwin & Verne Gagne (who he claims to have not been part of his official training), Bill Irwin began wrestling in 1979 in the National Wrestling Alliance's Central States territory and in Mid South Wrestling and World Class Championship Wrestling, winning the NWA Central States Tag Team Championship in 1979. He wrestled for a short period in MSW in 1982, teaming with his brother Scott as the masked tag team The "Super Destroyers", who were managed by Skandor Akbar. The team would later become known as The Lone Riders, in NSW. Irwin then moved on to Jim Crockett Promotions and the American Wrestling Association where he and his brother wrestled as the "Long Riders" and won several tag team titles together. Their tag team ended prematurely when Scott died from a brain tumor in 1987.

World Class Championship Wrestling (1981–1984, 1987–1989)
Working in both the Mid South and also the WCCW in 1981, he would
leave the Mid South in 1982 for WCCW, and now going by the name Wild Bill Irwin, he won the NWA Texas Heavyweight Championship off Al Madril and then having become a member of H & H Ltd tagging with Bugsy McGraw to win the NWA World Tag Team Championship (Texas version) then vacate the NWA Texas Heavyweight belt owing to a match between him and David Von Erich by 1983s
after blaming McGraw for losing them the tag belts, then, after a light feud, began teaming with King Kong Bundy becoming North American Tag Team Championship which he would do another 4 times with his brother Bill as the original tag team named The Super Destroyers (not the later ECW version) and their last run was as The Lone Riders. That same year, he won the WCCW Television Championship to complete his total of 7 times.

He made a late return in 1983 to WCCW as Super Destroyer No. 2 with his brother Scott, once again managed by Skandor Akbar, being the recent NWA North American Tag Team Champions for the first time. After the death of his brother Scott in 1987 caused by a brain tumor, he returned to World Class, working until the company folded in 1989. He briefly worked for the Wild West promotion in Dallas while he ran a wrestling school. Irwin later provided extensive commentary on the WWE's "The Triumph and Tragedy of WCCW" video retrospective of World Class Championship Wrestling, regarding his time in Texas, what it was like to wrestle in the Dallas Sportatorium, and his fateful trip with David Von Erich to Japan.

World Championship Wrestling (1989–1991) 
Irwin, as "Wild" Bill Irwin, also appeared sporadically in World Championship Wrestling, including in a loss to Davey Boy Smith in Smith's WCW debut at SuperBrawl III. He also worked in Japan for Network of Wrestling in 1993 and 1994.

Various promotions (1991–1996) 
Irwin would eventually go on to form a new tag team with Black Bart in the Global Wrestling Federation from 1991 to 1992.

World Wrestling Federation (1996–1997)
In 1996, Irwin began appearing regularly with the World Wrestling Federation as "The Goon", a hockey character who was "kicked out of every league he ever participated in." He made his TV debut on the July 20, 1996 episode of Superstars, defeating Dan Jesser. During his short tenure, he faced various wrestlers such as Marc Mero, Flash Funk, Barry Windham, Jake Roberts, and The Undertaker. His gimmick did not last long, as he left the company a few months after arriving, in March 1997.

Late career (1998–2012)
Upon leaving the WWF, Irwin wrestled on the independent circuit. A year later after leaving WWF, he returned in 1998 for two appearances teaming with Kit Carson as they were defeated by D'Lo Brown and Mark Henry on WWF Shotgun Saturday Night on February 16. He was also defeated by Tiger Ali Singh on June 16 in a dark match for Shotgun. In 2001, Irwin returned to the WWF for one night, resuming the gimmick of "The Goon" for the gimmick battle royal at WrestleMania X-Seven, which was ultimately won by The Iron Sheik. On Raw XV, the 15th-anniversary WWE Raw special on December 10, 2007, Irwin, wrestling as "The Goon" once again, and sporting a thick moustache, participated in the 15th Anniversary Battle Royal. He was eliminated by the Repo Man, and Ted DiBiase went on to win the royal. He retired in 2012.

Championships and accomplishments
 All Japan Pro Wrestling
 World's Strongest Tag Determination League Fighting Spirit Award (1989) - with Terry Gordy
 Big D Wrestling
 Big D Heavyweight Championship (2 times)
 Big D Brass Knuckles Championship (1 time)
 Big D Tag Team Championship (1 time) - with Mr. Mister
 Central States Wrestling
 NWA Central States Tag Team Championship (1 time) - with Bryan St. John
 Continental Wrestling Association
 AWA Southern Heavyweight Championship (1 time)
 AWA Southern Tag Team Championship (1 time) - with Larry Latham
 Georgia Championship Wrestling
 NWA National Tag Team Championship (1 time) - with Scott Irwin
 Global Wrestling Federation
 GWF Brass Knuckles Championship (1 time)
 GWF Tag Team Championship (1 time) - with Black Bart
 Lutte Internationale
 Canadian International Tag Team Championship (1 time) - with Scott Irwin
 NWA Big Time Wrestling / World Class Championship Wrestling
 NWA American Tag Team Championship (5 times) - with King Kong Bundy (1) and The Super Destroyer #2 (4)
 NWA Texas Heavyweight Championship (1 time)
 NWA World Tag Team Championship (Texas version) (2 times) - with Frank Dusek (1) and Bugsy McGraw (1)
 WCCW Television Championship (7 times)
 Pro Wrestling Illustrated
 PWI ranked him # 311 of the 500 best singles wrestlers during the PWI Years in 2003.
 Steel Domain Wrestling
 SDW Television Championship (1 time)
 Universal Wrestling Federation
 UWF World Tag Team Championship (1 time) - with Leroy Brown

References

External links
 
 

1954 births
American male professional wrestlers
Fictional ice hockey players
Living people
People from Pecos, Texas
Professional wrestlers from Texas
Stampede Wrestling alumni
20th-century professional wrestlers
21st-century professional wrestlers
GWF Tag Team Champions